The Sleeping Prince may refer to

The Sleeping Prince (fairy tale), Greek fairy tale collected by Georgios A. Megas in Folktales of Greece
The Sleeping Prince (play), 1953 play by Terence Rattigan
The Sleeping Prince, video game by Signal Studios
The Sleeping Prince, the second book in The Sin Eater's Daughter trilogy by Melinda Salisbury